The Europe/Africa Zone was one of the three zones of the regional Davis Cup competition in 1999.

In the Europe/Africa Zone there were four different tiers, called groups, in which teams competed against each other to advance to the upper tier. Winners in Group I advanced to the World Group Qualifying Round, along with losing teams from the World Group first round. Teams who lost in the first round competed in the relegation play-offs, with winning teams remaining in Group I, whereas teams who lost their play-offs were relegated to the Europe/Africa Zone Group II in 2000.

Participating nations

Draw

 and  relegated to Group II in 2000.

First round

Ukraine vs. Belarus

Second round

Romania vs. Croatia

Austria vs. Portugal

Finland vs. Israel

South Africa vs. Belarus

Second round relegation play-offs

Croatia vs. Portugal

Ukraine vs. Israel

References

External links
Davis Cup official website

Davis Cup Europe/Africa Zone
Europe Africa Zone Group I